Pio Nakubuwai was a Fijian rugby league footballer who represented Fiji at the 1995 World Cup.

Playing career
Nakubuwai played for Fiji at the 1992 World Sevens.

Nakubuwai made his test debut in 1994, playing against France. He then appeared for Fiji at the 1995 World Cup, playing in all three matches.

Nakubuwai played for the Yanco Wamoon Hawks in the Group 20 Rugby League competition and later switched to rugby union, playing for the Leeton Phantoms.

Personal life
His son, Ben who currently plays for Melbourne Storm in the Holden Cup Under 20's team, played for the Leeton Phantoms under-13's and also played for the Group 20 Rugby League under 15's.

References

Living people
Expatriate rugby union players in Australia
Fijian rugby league players
Fiji national rugby league team captains
Fiji national rugby league team players
Fijian expatriate rugby union players
Fijian expatriate sportspeople in Australia
Fijian rugby union players
I-Taukei Fijian people
Rugby league props
Year of birth missing (living people)
Place of birth missing (living people)